Nicolás Lapentti was the defending champion; however, he retired from professional tennis before this tournament.
Paul Capdeville won the title, defeating Diego Junqueira 6–3, 3–6, 6–3 in the final.

Seeds

Draw

Final four

Top half

Bottom half

References
 Main Draw
 Qualifying Draw

Challenger Ciudad de Guayaquil - Singles
2010 Singles